DVU may refer to:

 Delaware Valley University, a university in Doylestown, Pennsylvania
 German People's Union, Deutsche Volksunion, a nationalist political party in Germany